Santiago González and Scott Lipsky were the defending champions, but González did not participate. Lipsky partnered with Treat Huey, but lost in the quarterfinals to Pablo Andújar and Diego Schwartzman.

Seeds

Draw

References
 Main Draw

Irving Tennis Classic - Doubles